Suwwah (plural of  = traveller, wanderer, itinerant) are Coptic Christian anchorites in Egypt.

In folklore the suwwah are considered to have attained the highest level of spirituality, feeling no bodily pain, hunger, thirst, or sexual desire. They are also capable of keeping themselves invisible except when they choose to reveal themselves. Some hold that there are only ever twelve of them; others believe there are four hundred, and others still hold them to be limitless in number. It is also said that when one of the suwwah dies, the others choose his successor and summon that person to join them.

In a variant form they are described as “Sowha”, monks who dwell in the desert living off the land with aid from no man.  They live neither in monasteries nor even caves. Sometimes at night, the singing of psalms by sowha can be heard in the mountain canyons around monasteries. The sowha are shrouded in myth.  Some believe if one sees or speaks to one, it means that God will soon call you home.

The sowha are believed to be closer to heaven than earth, making their transition after death to heaven a relatively short one.  It would seem they are granted a special grace by which God may be pleased to send them back to earth to complete a mission for the Lord or so that their praise may once more ascend from the deserts of Egypt to heaven to the glory of God.

Madame Blavatsky had an interest in the suwwah, and spent time with a Coptic magician, Paolos Metamon. She considered that the suwwah to be survivors of a mysterious brotherhood, transmitters of an ancient pre-Christian system of beliefs.

References

Coptic Orthodox Church
Oriental Orthodox monks